Posyolok imeni Kalinina is a rural locality (a settlement) in Bobkovsky Selsoviet, Rubtsovsky District, Altai Krai, Russia. The population was 142 as of 2013. There are 5 streets.

Geography 
The settlement is located 34 km northeast of Rubtsovsk (the district's administrative centre) by road. Katkovo is the nearest rural locality.

References 

Rural localities in Rubtsovsky District